The qualification group 1 for the 2010 European Men's Handball Championship includes the national teams of Montenegro, Poland, Romania, Sweden and Turkey.

Standings

Fixtures and results

References
 EHF Euro Events – Men's EURO 2010 (qualification)

Qualification, Group 1